Cuisnahuat is a city and municipality in the Sonsonate department of El Salvador.

References 

Municipalities of the Sonsonate Department